Gregory Hayes (born 6 November 1955) is a South African former cricketer. He played in 55 first-class and 20 List A matches for Border from 1974/75 to 1987/88.

See also
 List of Border representative cricketers

References

External links
 

1955 births
Living people
South African cricketers
Border cricketers
People from Queenstown, South Africa
Cricketers from the Eastern Cape